The Battle of Middle Creek was an engagement fought January 10, 1862, in Eastern Kentucky during the American Civil War.  It was the only battle personally commanded by future president James A. Garfield, then a colonel in the Union Army.

Background
More than 1 month after Confederate Colonel John S. Williams left Kentucky, following the fight at Ivy Mountain, Brig. Gen. Humphrey Marshall led another force into Eastern Kentucky to continue recruiting activities. From his headquarters in Paintsville, on the Levisa Fork of the Big Sandy River, northwest of Prestonsburg, Marshall recruited volunteers. He raised a force of more than 2,000 men by early January, but could only partially equip them.

Battle
Union Brig. Gen. Don Carlos Buell directed Col. James A. Garfield, the future president, to force Marshall to retreat back into Virginia. Leaving Louisa, Garfield took command of the 18th Brigade and began his march south on Paintsville. He compelled the Confederates to abandon Paintsville and retreat to the vicinity of Prestonsburg. Garfield slowly headed south, but swampy areas and numerous streams slowed his movements, and he arrived in the vicinity of Marshall on the 9th. Heading out at 4:00 a.m. on January 10, Garfield marched a mile west near the Forks of Middle Creek, fought off the Confederate cavalry, and turned west to attack Marshall. Marshall had put his men in line of battle north and east of the creek near its forks. Garfield attacked shortly after noon, and the fighting continued for most of the afternoon until Union reinforcements arrived in time to dissuade the Confederates from assailing the Federal left. Instead, the Confederates retired south and were ordered back to Virginia on January 24. Garfield's force moved to Prestonsburg after the fight and then retired to Paintsville. Union forces had halted the Confederate 1861 offensive in Kentucky, and Middle Creek demonstrated that their strength had not diminished.

Aftermath
The Battle of Middle Creek, along with the Battle of Mill Springs a little more than a week later, cemented Union control of Eastern Kentucky until Confederate Gen. Braxton Bragg launched his offensive in the summer and fall of 1862. Following these two January victories in Kentucky, the Federals carried the war into Tennessee in February.

In October 1992, the battlefield was designated a National Historic Landmark by the National Park Service.

See also
 List of battles fought in Kentucky

References

External links
Middle Creek National Battlefield
National Park Service battle description
CWSAC Report Update - Kentucky
McLaughlin's Squadron of Cavalry (1862-1865)

Battles of the Offensive in Eastern Kentucky of the American Civil War
Battles of the Western Theater of the American Civil War
Union victories of the American Civil War
Battles of the American Civil War in Kentucky
1862 in Kentucky
1862 in the American Civil War
National Historic Landmarks in Kentucky
National Register of Historic Places in Floyd County, Kentucky
January 1862 events
American Civil War on the National Register of Historic Places
Conflict sites on the National Register of Historic Places in Kentucky